The Hong Kong Red Cross International Humanitarian Law Moot is an annual international moot court competition organised by the Hong Kong Red Cross and International Committee of the Red Cross in collaboration with universities in Hong Kong. It is an inter-university competition on international humanitarian law for law schools in the Asia-Pacific region (Asia, Australia, and New Zealand).

The moot, which is hosted in Hong Kong, started as a local moot in 2003 before becoming a regional moot the next year. In recent times more than 100 law schools have participated in the local and regional rounds each year, with the top 20-odd teams making it to the international rounds. Counsel need to prepare written and oral submissions for both sides (Prosecutor and Defendant) before a mock International Criminal Court. For the 2020 edition, owing to travel restrictions brought about by Covid-19, the tournament winner was adjudged by memorials only. As the restrictions persisted in some countries, the 2021 and 2022 editions adopted the online format for the oral rounds.

Competition records

See also
Australian Law Students Association
Jean Pictet IHL Competition

References

International law
Moot court competitions